Khong Yar Alivand (also Romanized as Khong Yār ‘Alīvand; also known as Khonak Yar ‘Alīvand and Yār ‘Alīvand) is a village in Howmeh-ye Gharbi Rural District, in the Central District of Izeh County, Khuzestan Province, Iran. At the 2006 census, its population was 138, in 20 families.

References 

Populated places in Izeh County